Salvatore Esposito (born 7 October 2000) is an Italian footballer who plays as a midfielder for  club Spezia, on loan from SPAL. He also represents the Italy national team.

Club career

SPAL
He first joined SPAL on loan from Inter Milan U-19 squad in January 2018. He made several bench appearances for SPAL late in the 2017–18 Serie A season.

On 29 June 2018, SPAL secured his permanent transfer from Inter.

Loan to Ravenna
On 9 January 2019, he was loaned to Serie C club Ravenna until the end of the season.

He made his Serie C debut for Ravenna on 22 January 2019 in a game against Triestina as a half-time substitute for Carlo Martorelli and scored a late-added-time equalizer in a 2–2 draw.

Loan to Chievo
On 11 July 2019, Esposito joined Serie B club Chievo on loan until 30 June 2020.

Spezia
On 6 January 2023, Esposito joined Serie A club Spezia on loan with an obligation to buy.

International career
He was first called up to represent his country in 2015 for the Italy U16, as a player of Inter Milan.

On 16 January 2019, he made his debut for the Italy U19 in a friendly against Spain and scored a goal in a 3–0 victory.

He took part in the 2019 FIFA U-20 World Cup with the Italy U20 squad, reaching the fourth place.

He made his debut with the Italy U21 on 16 November 2019, in a qualifying match won 3–0 against Iceland.

He was selected in the senior Italy squad for the 2022 Finalissima against Argentina on 1 June 2022 and for 2022–23 UEFA Nations League group stage matches against Germany, Hungary, England and Germany between 4 and 14 June 2022.

Personal life
He is the older brother of Inter Milan striker Sebastiano Esposito.

Career statistics

Honours
Italy U20
FIFA U-20 World Cup fourth place: 2019

References

External links
 

2000 births
People from Castellammare di Stabia
Footballers from Campania
Living people
Italian footballers
Association football midfielders
S.P.A.L. players
Ravenna F.C. players
A.C. ChievoVerona players
Spezia Calcio players
Serie C players
Serie B players
Italy youth international footballers
Italy international footballers